Spread of Islam among Kurds started in the 7th century with the Early Muslim conquests. Before Islam, the majority of Kurds followed a western Iranic pre-Zoroastrian faith which derived directly from Indo-Iranian tradition, some elements of this faith survived in Yezidism, Yarsanism and Kurdish Alevism. Kurds were a nation divided between the Byzantine and Persian Empires when Islam first appeared. Jaban al-Kurdi and his son Meymun al-Kurdi were the first Kurds who converted to Islam and Halîl al-Kurdi es-Semmâni was one of the first Kurdish tabi'uns. However, mass conversion of Kurds to Islam didn't happen until the reign of Umar ibn Al-Khattab, second caliph of the Rashidun Caliphate between 634-644. The Kurds first came into contact with the Arab armies during the Arab conquest of mesopotamia in 637. The kurdish tribes had been an important element in the Sassanid empire, and initially gave it strong support as it tried to withstand the Muslim armies, between 639 - 644, Once it was clear that the empire would fall, the Kurdish chiefs one by one submitted to the Arab armies and to the new religion. Today the majority of Kurds are Sunni Muslims, and there are Alevi and Shia minorities. Sunni Muslim Kurds are mostly Shafiʽis and Hanafis.

The remains of a 7th century Gorani Kurdish poem, written on a piece of deer skin in Pahlavi script, found around modern day Sulaymaniyah, recites the events of the Islamic conquest of Kurdistan first hand:

Notable Muslim Kurds from the Middle Ages 
Bassami Kurdi (9th century), Evdilsemedê Babek (972-1019), and Ali Hariri (1009-1079) were the first Kurdish Islamic poets and authors. Fakhr-un-Nisa (1091-1179) was the first female Kurdish Islamic scholar, muhaddith and calligrapher. The Abulfeda crater in the Moon was named after Kurdish Islamic geographer and historian Abulfeda (1273-1331).

Menüçehr Mosque, the first mosque in the current borders of Turkey, was built in 1072 by the Kurdish Sunni Muslim dynasty Shaddadids.

Kurdish madrasas 

With the spread of Islam in Kurdistan, a new style of civilization was formed in the region. One of the grounds of this new civilization was madrasas. The first Kurdish madrasa was formed around 950s in Hamadan, Iranian Kurdistan. However, Saladin changed the educational status of madrasas where only Islamic sciences were taught, and started to teach many branches of science there, giving more importance to Kurdish lessons.

Lessons taught in the Kurdish madrasas included Tafsir of the Quran, Hadith, Fiqh, Logic, Statute, Mathematics, Astronomy, Medicine and Philosophy. Most of the books that were used as textbooks in Kurdish madrasas were in Arabic, and they were translated to Kurdish by educationalists and experts. There was an obligation of at least one child in each household having the necessity of being educated in a madrasa among the Kurds. Around 80% of students in Kurdish madrasas were male.

References 

Spread of Islam
History of the Kurdish people
History of Kurdistan